Elusa duplicata is a species of moth of the family Noctuidae. It was described by Warren, in 1913. It is found in New Guinea.

References

Moths described in 1913
Hadeninae
Moths of New Guinea